The women's artistic team all-around competition at the 2016 Summer Olympics was held on 9 August 2016 at the HSBC Arena.

The United States finished first in qualifications and then won the event final by over eight points. It was the USA's second consecutive Olympic team gold. The 2016 team, known as the Final Five, was led by Simone Biles, who performed all four rotations in the final. Russia won their second consecutive Olympic team silver.

Competition format
The top 8 teams in qualifications, based on combined scores of each apparatus, advanced to the final.
In the final, each team selected three gymnasts to compete on each apparatus. All scores on each apparatus were summed to give a final team score. The scores in qualification did not count in the final.

Qualification

Final

The medals were presented by Denis Oswald, Switzerland; Syed Shahid Ali, Pakistan; and Anant Singh, South Africa; members of the International Olympic Committee, and the gifts were presented by Bruno Grandi, President of the FIG, Mireille Ganzin, President of the FIG Aerobic Gymnastics Technical Committee and Rosi Taeymans, President of the FIG Acrobatic Gymnastics Technnical Committee.

References

Women's artistic team all-around
2016
Olympics
2016 in women's gymnastics
Women's events at the 2016 Summer Olympics